Kim Hyuk (born May 4, 1985) is a South Korean football player who has played as a midfielder for Incheon United since 2008.

References

1985 births
Living people
South Korean footballers
Incheon United FC players

Association football midfielders